Charles Edward "Chappy" Marvin (born January 1929) was an American football and baseball coach.  Marvin served as the head football coach at Adrian College in Adrian, Michigan for six seasons, from 1962 to 1967, compiling a record of 14–33. Marvin graduated from Adrian before beginning his coaching career in the late 1940s as an assistant to Bob Waldorf at Battle Creek Central High School in Battle Creek, Michigan. He was the head football coach at Adrian High School before he was hired to replaced Les Leggett as head football coach at Adrian College. He resigned from Adrian College at the end of the 1967 season.

Marvin married Carol Jane Wear.

Head coaching record

College football

References

1929 births
Living people
Adrian Bulldogs baseball coaches
Adrian Bulldogs football coaches
High school football coaches in Michigan
Adrian College alumni